Day and Night is a 2004 Swedish drama film directed by Simon Staho.

Plot 
Thomas embarks on a journey to connect one final time with each of the meaningful people in his life. Hating the man he's become, he ends the tour by committing suicide—-an event foretold in the film's opening narration.

Cast 
 Mikael Persbrandt as Thomas
 Sam Kessel as Emil
 Maria Bonnevie as Sarah
 Michael Nyqvist as Jacob
 Lena Endre as Anna
 Hans Alfredson as Bilisten
 Pernilla August as Eva
 Fares Fares as Kristian
 Marie Göranzon as Modern
 Tuva Novotny as Desiré
 Erland Josephson as narrator (voice)

References

External links 
 
 

2004 drama films
2004 films
Swedish drama films
2000s Swedish films